Sturisoma robustum is a species of armored catfish native to the La Plata Basin of Argentina, Brazil and Paraguay.  This species grows to a length of  SL.

References
 

Sturisoma
Fish of South America
Fish of Argentina
Fish of Brazil
Fish of Paraguay
Fish described in 1904